Nicholas Lim may refer to:

 Nicholas Lim (entrepreneur) (born 1997 or 1998), technology entrepreneur
 Nicholas Lim (swimmer) (born 2001), Hong Kong swimmer

See also 
 Nick Lim (born 1998), Dutch football player